The Michell solution is a general solution to the elasticity equations in polar coordinates developed by J. H. Michell.

Michell showed that the general solution can be expressed in terms of an Airy stress function of the form

The terms  and  define a trivial null state of stress and are ignored.

Stress components 
The stress components can be obtained by substituting the Michell solution into the equations for stress in terms of the Airy stress function (in cylindrical coordinates).  A table of stress components is shown below.

Displacement components 
Displacements  can be obtained from the Michell solution by using the stress-strain and strain-displacement relations.  A table of displacement components corresponding the terms in the Airy stress function for the Michell solution is given below.  In this table

Note that a rigid body displacement can be superposed on the Michell solution of the form

to obtain an admissible displacement field.

References

See also 
 Linear elasticity
 Flamant solution
 John Henry Michell

Elasticity (physics)